Kunjeldho is a 2021 Indian Malayalam-language romantic comedy film written and directed by Mathukkutty.The movie is produced by Suvin K Varkey and Prasobh Krishna for their studio Little Big Films. Asif Ali plays the leading role in this film.

The film was scheduled to be released on 27 August 2021 during the occasion of Onam, but was postponed due to closure of theatres in Kerala.

Synopsis
Kunjeldho is a love story between college students, filled with the usual campus fun, fights and a farewell function which brings a twist in the life of Kunjeldho and his girlfriend Niveditha.

Kunjeldho is struck at first sight by Niveditha, as they start their lives as college students. She quickly loses her heart to him as well, and at a college function, the couple consummate their love. The couple have to leave home and after struggling to find a home and survive, they are taken in by a kind professor. Will the couple finally win the support of their family forms the rest of the story.

Cast
 Asif Ali as Kunjeldho
 Gopika Udayan as Niveditha
 Vineeth Sreenivasan as Junior doctor
 Siddique as Professor Gheevarghese
 Rekha as Kunjeldho's mother
 Meera Nair
Mitun m das as Ikru
 Anil Murali
 Sanju Sanichen as Pamp Saneesh
 Anarkali Nazar
 Sudheesh as John Kunjeldhos father
 Aswathy Sreekanth as Teacher
 Akhil Manoj as Sooraj
 Abin Paul as Brother Joby
 Jasnya Jayadeesh
 Kritika Pradeep as Shalini
 Arjun Gopal
 Akku Melparamba
 Roopesh Peethambaran
 Haritha Haridas
 Shruthi Rajanikanth
 Margret Antony

Filming
Principal photography began on 2 September 2019 with a customary pooja function held at Kottayam. Filming took place early in the schedule at Aluva, Perumbavoor, Thodupuzha and Paravoor.

Reception

Malayala Manorama gave a rating of 3.5/5 and said "Kunjeldho will remain an aesthetically driven and brilliantly narrated love story". Times of India gave a rating of 3.5/5 and said 'Kunjeldho' is a feel good movie with campus antics,love,emotions and songs.

References

External links
 
 

2021 films
2020s Malayalam-language films
2021 directorial debut films
Films scored by Shaan Rahman